Oreste Piccioni (October 24, 1915 – April 13, 2002) was an  Italian-American physicist who made important contributions to elementary particle physics during the early years of its history.  
He was a graduate student of Enrico Fermi at the University of Rome, receiving his doctorate in 1938.
Remaining in Italy during World War II, he did fundamental research under difficult conditions in the basement of a high school, which first clarified the nature of the muon.

Biography
In 1946 he emigrated to the United States, where he worked first at MIT with Bruno Rossi, and then at BNL's Cosmotron, developing faster nuclear electronics and essential techniques for extracting, transporting, and focusing beams of high energy particles.  
Later at UC Berkeley's Lawrence Radiation laboratory he was a co-discoverer of the antineutron in 1955 at the Bevatron.

His important contributions to the design of the experiment that discovered the antiproton in 1955 were acknowledged in the 1959 ceremony in which the Nobel Prize in physics was awarded to E. Segrè and O. Chamberlain.
Unfortunately a famous quarrel over credit and priority for the discovery embittered Piccioni for much of his later life, to the point that he filed a lawsuit in 1972 against Segrè and Chamberlain, seeking damages and public acknowledgment of his contributions.  The suit was ultimately dismissed as filed too late for consideration of the issues.

An important theoretical paper with Abraham Pais in 1955 considered regeneration in neutral kaon mixing.  
In 1960 he joined the faculty of the University of California, San Diego (UCSD), where his group made the first measurement of the neutral kaon K1-K2 mass difference.

Piccioni retired from UCSD as Professor Emeritus in 1986, but continued to give review talks and work in the investigation of fundamental problems in quantum mechanics.  
In 1999 he was awarded the Matteucci Medal by the Accademia Nazionale delle Scienze (National Academy of Sciences) in Italy.

Selected publications

 On the Disintegration of Negative Mesons. With M. Conversi and E. Pancini. Phys. Rev. 71, 209 (1947).
 External Proton Beam of the Cosmotron. With D. Clark et al. Rev. of Scien. Instruments 26, 232 (1955).
 Note on the Decay and Absorption of the Theta-zero. With A. Pais. Phys. Rev. 100, 1487 (1955).
 Antineutrons Produced from Antiprotons in Charge Exchange Collisions. With B. Cork et al. Phys. Rev. 104, 1193 (1956).
 Regeneration of Neutral K Mesons and their Mass Difference. With R. Good et al. Phys. Rev. 124, 1223 (1961).
 Is the Einstein-Podolsky-Rosen Paradox Demanded by Quantum Mechanics? With P. Bowles et al. In Open Questions in Quantum Physics. Ed. G. Tarozzi and A. van der Merwe. D. Reidel Publishing Co., Holland 103-118 (1984).
 A Discussion of the EPR Contained in QM Terms without Arguments of Politics or Bell's Relations. With W. Mehlhop. In Proc. of Symposium "New Techniques and Ideas in Quantum Measurement Theory", New York, Annals of New York Academy of Sciences 480, 458 (1987).
 Bell's Theorem and the Foundation of Modern Physics. Ed. A. van der Mezne and F. Selleri. World Scientific Publishing Co., Cesena, Italy, October 1991.

References

Particle physicists
1915 births
2002 deaths
Italian emigrants to the United States